Anita Thallaug (born 14 February 1938) is a Norwegian actress and singer.

Biography
Thallaug was born in Bærum on 14 February 1938.

She has featured in musicals, cinema and TV programs. Under the name Vesla Rolfsen, at the age of seven, she was performing at the Spider theatre in Oslo. She featured frequently in NRK children's programs of the 1950s.

Thallaug was the Norwegian contestant in the Eurovision Song Contest 1963, with the song "Solhverv", where she finished 13th (last). She was the first of four Norwegian entrants to score no points in the competition.

Anita Thallaug is the younger sister of opera singer Edith Thallaug.

Melodi Grand Prix entries

Films
1990: Den spanske flue (The Spanish Fly) (TV) Mrs Meisel
1964: Klokker i måneskinn (Bells in the Moonlight) Mannekeng, 'Manager of affairs'
1962: Operation Løvsprett Søster Bitten
1957: Blondin i fara (Blonde in Danger) (Swedish film) Mona Mace
1954: I moralens navn (The Moral Reputation)

References

External links
 
 Omtale i Norsk pop- og rockleksikon fra 2005

1938 births
Living people
People from Bærum
Norwegian women singers
Norwegian musical theatre actresses
Norwegian film actresses
Norwegian television actresses
Melodi Grand Prix contestants
Eurovision Song Contest entrants for Norway
Eurovision Song Contest entrants of 1963
Melodi Grand Prix winners